Farnham was a constituency covering the south-westernmost and various western parts of Surrey for the House of Commons of the UK Parliament, 1918—1983. Its main successor was South West Surrey.  The seat was formed with north-eastern territory including Woking from Chertsey in 1918 and shed the Woking area to form its own seat in 1950.  It elected one Member of Parliament (MP).  During its 65-year span its voters elected three Conservatives successively.

Boundaries
The constituency took its name from the town of Farnham and included other towns and a large agricultural and forested hills area with significant sandy heathland rising up to the north. The boundaries were altered at each redistribution of parliamentary seats, reflecting the increase in population of the area and thus the splitting of Western Surrey (or Guildford) into South West Surrey or Guildford and North West Surrey, followed by South West Surrey, most of Surrey Heath, and Guildford covering this part of Surrey, the arrangement by 1983.

1918–1950
The constituency was created by the Representation of the People Act 1918 as one of seven county constituencies within Surrey.

The rural district of Farnham (based on the Hundred before it); in the Guildford Rural District — the civil parish Pirbright; and the Farnham, Frimley (including Camberley), Windlesham, and Woking urban districts.

1950–1983
Rural Surrey had ten county constituencies in 1950 — Farnham was defined as comprising:
The borough of Godalming;
the urban districts of Farnham and Haslemere;
the parish of Seale in the rural district of Guildford (including Tongham)
Parishes in the rural district of Hambledon: Chiddingfold, Dockenfield, Elstead, Frensham, Peper Harow, Thursley, Tilford and Witley.

To enable the above, Godalming and Haslemere were transferred from Guildford — Woking, Windlesham and Pirbright were transferred to the new seat of Woking.

The constituency was unaltered at the redistribution of 1974 which coincided with a major local government consolidation, the main local authority approximating to the seat becoming Waverley (district).

Type for returning officer and election expenses
The seat was a county constituency.

Members of Parliament

Elections

Elections in the 1910s

Elections in the 1920s

Elections in the 1930s 

General Election 1939–40

Another General Election was required to take place before the end of 1940. The political parties had been making preparations for an election to take place and by the Autumn of 1939, the following candidates had been selected; 
Conservative: Godfrey Nicholson
Labour: C W Gittins

Elections in the 1940s

Elections in the 1950s

Elections in the 1960s

Elections in the 1970s

See also

Notes and references
References

Notes

Parliamentary constituencies in South East England (historic)
Constituencies of the Parliament of the United Kingdom established in 1918
Politics of Surrey
Farnham